Boletus michoacanus is a pored mushroom of the family Boletaceae. Found in Mexico, the species was described as new to science in 1978 by American mycologist Rolf Singer.

See also
 List of Boletus species

References

External links

michoacanus
Fungi described in 1978
Fungi of Mexico
Taxa named by Rolf Singer
Fungi without expected TNC conservation status